Lisa Bentley (born November 28, 1968) is a Canadian triathlete. She has been competing on the Ironman race series since late in the 1990s. In 1988, Bentley was diagnosed with cystic fibrosis. Despite this, she has won 11 Ironman competitions. In 2006, Bentley placed third at the Ironman World Championship, her best showing and finished second at the Ironman 70.3 World Championships in Clearwater, Florida three weeks later.

Ironman series victories

 2000 IM New Zealand
 2001 IM New Zealand
 2002 IM Australia
 2003 IM Australia
 2003 IM Canada
 2004 IM Australia
 2004 IM Canada
 2005 IM Australia
 2005 IM Germany
 2006 IM Australia
 2007 IM Canada

Ironman World Championships

 1997 - 9th won by: Heather Fuhr
 2000 - 6th won by: Natascha Badmann
 2002 - 6th won by: Natascha Badmann
 2003 - 5th won by: Lori Bowden
 2004 - 4th won by: Natascha Badmann
 2005 - DNF (medical) won by: Natascha Badmann
 2006 - 3rd won by: Michellie Jones

References

External links
Official Site

1968 births
Living people
Canadian female triathletes
Sportspeople from Etobicoke
Triathlon people from Ontario
Place of birth missing (living people)
21st-century Canadian women